Polymixia is the only extant genus of the order Polymixiiformes and the only genus in Polymixiidae. It contains 10 species, all of which live in deepwater marine environments. They are found in tropical and subtropical waters of the Atlantic, Indian and western Pacific Oceans.

Classification
There are currently 10 recognized species in this genus:

 Polymixia berndti C. H. Gilbert, 1905 (Pacific beardfish)
 Polymixia busakhini Kotlyar, 1993 (Busakhin's beardfish)
 Polymixia fusca Kotthaus, 1970
 Polymixia japonica Günther, 1877 (Silver eye)
 Polymixia longispina S. M. Deng, G. Q. Xiong & H. X. Zhan, 1983
 Polymixia lowei Günther, 1859 (Beardfish)
 Polymixia nobilis R. T. Lowe, 1838 (Stout beardfish)
 Polymixia salagomeziensis Kotlyar, 1991
 Polymixia sazonovi Kotlyar, 1992
 Polymixia yuri Kotlyar, 1982

References

Polymixiiformes
Extant Late Cretaceous first appearances
Ray-finned fish genera